Fynn Arkenberg (born 4 March 1996) is a German professional footballer who plays as a centre-back for Hannover 96 II.

Club career
Arkenberg is a youth exponent from Hannover 96. He made his Bundesliga debut on 7 May 2016 against TSG 1899 Hoffenheim. He played the full game.

References

External links
 
 Profile at kicker.de

1996 births
Living people
People from Neustadt am Rübenberge
German footballers
Association football central defenders
Hannover 96 players
Hannover 96 II players
Hallescher FC players
SV Rödinghausen players
TSV Havelse players
Bundesliga players
2. Bundesliga players
3. Liga players
Regionalliga players
Footballers from Lower Saxony